The mixed individual BC1 boccia event at the 2020 Summer Paralympics will be contested between 28 August to 1 September 2021 at the Ariake Gymnastics Centre. This event is a mixed event; 19 male and female players from 13 nations will be competing.

The event structure is the same as the 2016 event, with pool stages. The top two players from each of four pools then entered into a quarter-final single-elimination stage, with the losing semifinalists playing off for bronze.

Results

Final stage
The final stage (or knockout stage) will be played between 31 August to 1 September.

Pool
The pools (or can be known as a group stage) will be played between 28 to 30 August 2021. The top two players in each pool will qualify to the quarterfinals.

Pool A

Pool B

Pool C

Pool D

References

Mixed individual BC1